Sweet Rosie Jones is an album by Buck Owens and his Buckaroos, released in 1968.

Track listing
All songs by Buck Owens unless otherwise noted.

Side one
 "Hello Happiness Goodbye Loneliness"
 "Sweet Rosie Jones"
 "If I Had Three Wishes" (Owens, Don Rich)  
 "Swinging Doors" (Merle Haggard)
 "You'll Never Miss the Water" (Owens, Rich)  
 "Sally Mary and Jerry" (Owens, Rolly Weber)

Side two
 "How Long Will My Baby Be Gone"  
 "Leave Me Something to Remember You By" (Owens, Rich)  
 "Heartaches Have Just Started" (Owens, Rich)  
 "Everybody Needs Somebody"
 "Girl on Sugar Pie Lane" (Tommy Collins)
 "Happy Times Are Here Again"

1968 albums
Buck Owens albums
Capitol Records albums
Albums produced by Ken Nelson (United States record producer)
Albums recorded at Capitol Studios